This is a list of people connected to the University at Buffalo. There are more than 260,000 living alumni of UB. Notable alumni include the CEO's of Paramount Pictures and A+E Networks, two NASA astronauts, a recipient of the Edward R. Murrow Award, and a former prime minister. UB is one of the only two institutions of higher learning in the United States which were founded by a U.S. President (Millard Fillmore), with the other one being the University of Virginia.

Notable faculty
This list includes both present and former faculty members.

Nobel Laureates

Award recipients

Academia

Collegiate athletics

Notable alumni

Law, politics, and government

Science, technology, and engineering

Medicine

Business

News

Art, Film, theatre, and television

Academia

Literature

Music

Sports and athletics

Chancellors and presidents

From its inception until 1962, the private school was known as the University of Buffalo, and it was headed by a chancellor.  Since it became the public State University of New York at Buffalo, it has been called the University at Buffalo, and the CEO is its president.

1846–1874: Millard Fillmore; 13th President of the United States and 12th Vice President of the United States
1882–1884: Orsamus H. Marshall 
1885–1895: E. Carleton Sprague 
1895–1902: James O. Putnam; New York State Senator and Postmaster General of Buffalo 
1902–1903: Wilson S. Bissell; 36th United States Postmaster General
1905–1920: Charles Phelps Norton
1922–1950: Samuel P. Capen; former Director of the American Council on Education.
1950–1954: T. R. McConnell; former University of Minnesota Dean of the College of Sciences, Literature, and Arts.
1954–1966: Clifford C. Furnas; former Assistant Secretary of Defense for the United States.
1955–1957: Claude E. Puffer (acting)
1966–1970: Martin Meyerson; Interim Chancellor for the University of California Berkeley, President of the University of Pennsylvania
1970–1982: Robert L. Ketter 
1982–1991: Steven Sample;  10th President of the University of Southern California
1991–2004: Bill Greiner
2004–2011: John B. Simpson; former Dean of the College of Arts and Sciences at the University of Washington
2011–present: Satish K. Tripathi

See also
University at Buffalo

References

External links

University at Buffalo – Official website
Books by UB alumni

University at Buffalo